Hugo Sánchez Guerrero (born 8 May 1981) is a Mexican former footballer, who last played for Correcaminos UAT on loan from Chiapas F.C.

Sánchez made his First Division debut with Tigres in the Apertura 2001. The club ended his first season as runners-up in the League.

Sánchez played for Mexico at the 2004 Summer Olympics. He also played for his country on the 2006 World Cup Qualifyiers, including the historical game against Costa Rica, where Mexico won the away game in that nation for the first time in 40 years.

On 23 February 2005, he became the first person born in Monterrey to score in a Copa Libertadores.

References

External links
 
 
 
 

1981 births
Living people
Footballers from Nuevo León
Mexico international footballers
Footballers at the 2004 Summer Olympics
Olympic footballers of Mexico
2005 FIFA Confederations Cup players
Tigres UANL footballers
Atlético Morelia players
Correcaminos UAT footballers
Liga MX players
Sportspeople from Monterrey
Association football defenders
Mexican footballers